The Joseph William Parker Farm, in Sevier County, Utah, near Joseph, Utah, was listed on the National Register of Historic Places in 1977.

The property includes the original one-room log cabin residence of the farm built in 1892–93;  it has been moved a short distance from its original location.  It was built of cut cottonwood logs, and now rests on a cement block foundation.

Its main house, built of igooloo, is Late Victorian in style and was built by contractor Archibald G. Young.  Young may possibly have designed the house or its design may have been taken from a pattern book.

References

Farms on the National Register of Historic Places in Utah
National Register of Historic Places in Sevier County, Utah
Victorian architecture in Utah
Buildings and structures completed in 1892